Nabeela Farida Tunis (née Koroma) is a Sierra Leonean politician who has served as the country's Foreign Minister since May 2019.

Education and early career
Tunis has a Bachelor of Arts in political science from Fourah Bay College and English and a Master's in Rural Development from Njala University, both part of the University of Sierra Leone. She worked as Program Manager of the Women's Network for Environmental Sustainability and as a Senior National Officer within the United Nations office in Sierra Leone.

Political career

Tunis was appointed the Minister of Planning and Economic Development on 8 May 2018. In this role she helped produce the president's National Economic Development Plan, but was also responsible for a controversial NGO policy that activists considered "unfriendly".

Tunis was appointed Foreign Minister in a cabinet reshuffle by President Julius Maada Bio in May 2019, replacing 2018 presidential candidate Alie Kabba, who was demoted to the role of UN representative. She has described her foreign policy direction as "Sierra Leone first" and said that her foreign policy objectives are linked to boosting the country's image and prestige, including transparency in business as part of the president's renewed fight against corruption.

Awards and honours
Tunis was named one of Sierra Leone's Fifty Most Influential Women in 2019 and nominated again for the award in 2020.

Personal life
Tunis is married to Sidie Mohammed Tunis, the Parliamentary Leader of the governing Sierra Leone People's Party and Speaker of the ECOWAS Parliament. They have three children.

References

External links
 Interview with Minister Nabeela Tunis - 2019

Living people
Fourah Bay College alumni
Njala University alumni
Sierra Leone People's Party politicians
Female foreign ministers
Foreign Ministers of Sierra Leone
Women government ministers of Sierra Leone
Year of birth missing (living people)

21st-century Sierra Leonean women politicians
21st-century Sierra Leonean politicians